The 2011–12 season was Edinburgh Rugby's eleventh season competing in the Pro12.

Michael Bradley took over Edinburgh in the summer of 2011. He previously had been in charge of Connacht and Ireland A.

While domestically the season never really took off, the 2011–12 Heineken Cup campaign proved to be the most successful in the club's history by topping Pool 2. Along the way, competing in the remarkable 48-47 match against Racing Métro and setting up a quarter final against French rugby giants Toulouse by scoring 4 tries against London Irish. The game itself was very tight, with Edinburgh holding out for a 19-14 win thanks to an early try from Mike Blair and penalties from captain Greig Laidlaw, setting up a semi-final in Dublin against Ulster.

2011 saw the introduction of numerous youngster into the squad this season, which makes the results even more astonishing. Début seasons for regular starters, 21-year-olds Matt Scott and Grant Gilchrist as well as 19-year-old Harry Leonard. And first full season for back row pair Stuart McInally and David Denton.

More than 37 881 fans, a UK record crowd for a Heineken Cup quarter final, witnessed Edinburgh become the first Scottish club to reach the Heineken Cup semi-final.

Squad List

Transfers 2011/2012

Players in
Steven Lawrie from Doncaster
Matthew Scott - Currie RFC
Sean Cox - Sale Sharks
Chris Leck - Sale Sharks
Alex Black - Leeds Carnegie
Sep Visser - Tynedale R.F.C. (will have dual registration with Boroughmuir RFC)

Players out
Fraser McKenzie - Sale Sharks
Scott Macleod - Kobelco Steelers
David Blair - Retired
Craig Hamilton - Tarbes
Mark Robertson - Scotland 7s
Scott Newlands - Oyonnax
David Young - Leeds Carnegie
Simon Webster - Retired

Pro 12 League Table

Heineken Cup

Pool stage

Quarter-finals

Semi-finals

References 

2011–12 in Scottish rugby union
2011-12
2011–12 Pro12 by team
2011–12 Heineken Cup by team